Invasion Planet Earth is a 2019 British science fiction film written and directed by Simon Cox, with the original title Kaleidoscope Man. It tells the story of a man who learns that he's going to become a father on the same day as Earth is invaded by aliens.

Filming was supported by crowdfunding and took place over  ten years, with many scenes filmed in Birmingham. The cast includes Toyah Willcox, with a cameo appearance from Ben Shockley. Willcox also contributed a song to the film, "Step into the New World", played over end credits. In 2021, Simon Cox began fundraising for a second film, Of Infinite Worlds.

In 2022, film shots from the accompanying documentary The Making of Invasion Planet Earth were falsely presented on the internet as fabricated evidence of attacks as part of the 2022 Russian invasion of Ukraine.

Cast
 Simon Haycock – Thomas Dunn
 Lucy Drive – Mandy Dunn
 Julie Hoult – Harriet
 Danny Steele – Floyd
 Sophie Anderson – Samantha
 Toyah Willcox – Claire Dove
 Jon Campling – Lucian
 Michael Bott – Jeff Phillburn
 Kate Speak – Claire Dangerfield
 Julian Boote – Alan Carter
 John Dyer – Carl Henderson
 Ian Brooker – Father Robert
 Nina Stratford – President of the United States
 Ben Shockley – Billy McCoy
 Jessica Walker - School Girl

References

External links
 
 
 

2019 independent films
2019 science fiction films
Films set in Birmingham, West Midlands
Films shot in the Canary Islands
2010s English-language films